Bogdašići is a small settlement in the municipality of Tivat, Montenegro. It is located east of Tivat.

Demographics
According to the 2011 census, Bogdašići had a population of 57 people.

References

Croat communities in Montenegro
Populated places in Tivat Municipality